Yenicekent is a depending township in Buldan district, Denizli Province in southwestern Turkey. The region is notable for its high plains covered with dense forests. Yenicekent is also the site of ancient Tripolis of Phrygia.

History

Tripolis of Phrygia was an ancient settlement near the village of Yenice in Buldan district. Ruins date back to the Hellenistic period. Tripolis, which was on the Sardis-Laodicea road extending down to Mesopotamia, was established for military and commercial purposes. Tripolis became famous with the expansion of Christianity with its people working in agriculture and weaving. The present weaving industry in Buldan can be traced back to ancient times. Few remains of the city walls; only the theatre, the hippodrome and some tombs survived the great earthquake of 1354.

Populated places in Denizli Province
Towns in Turkey